Ghana competed at the 1972 Summer Olympics in Munich, West Germany.

Medalists

Results by event

Athletics
Men's 100 m:
 George Kofi Daniels
 Heats — 10.65 s (did not advance)

Men's 200 m:
 George Kofi Daniels
 Heats — 21.05 s
 2nd Round — 21.10 s (did not advance)
 James Addy
 Heats — 21.06 s (did not advance)
 Sam Bugri
 Heats — 47.83 s (did not advance)
 2nd Round — 47.34 s (did not advance)

Men's 1500 m:
 Billy Fordjour
 Heats — 4:08.2 (did not advance)

Men's 3000 m steeplechase:
 Robert Hackman
 Heats — 8:57.6 (did not advance)

Men's 4 × 100 m relay:
 Ohene Karikari, James Addy, Sandy Osei Agyeman and George Kofi Daniels
 Heats — 39.46 s
 2nd Round — 39.99 s (did not advance)

Men's Long jump:
 Michael Ahey
 Heat — 7.39 m (did not advance)
 Joshua Owusu
 Heat — 7.93 m (did not advance)
 Final — 8.01 m (4th place)

Men's Triple jump:
 Johnson Amoah
 Heat — 15.84 m (did not advance)
 Moise Pomaney
 Heat — 15.72 m (did not advance)

Women's 100 m
 Hannah Afriyie
 Heat — 11.90 s
 2nd Round — 12.04 (did not advance)
 Alice Annum 
 Heat — 11.54 s
 2nd Round — 11.45 s
 Semifinal — 11.47 s
 Final — 11.41 s (6th place)

Alternate member
 Juliana Ohemeng

Boxing
Bantamweight:
 Destimo Joe
 1/16-Final — Defeated Werner Schäfer of West Germany (3 — 2)
 1/8-Final — Lost to Ferry Egberty Moniaga of Indonesia (1 — 4)

Featherweight:
 Cofie Joe
 1/32-Final — Lost to Orlando Palacios of Cuba (1 — 4)

Light Welterweight:
 Lawson Odartey
 1/16-Final — Lost to Issaka Dabore of Niger (RSC, 3. RD)

Welterweight:
 Emma Flash Ankudey
 1/16-Final — Lost to Damdinjav Bandi of Mongolia (2 — 3)

Light middleweight:
 Ricky Barnor
 1/32-Final — Lost to Rolando Garbey of Cuba (0 — 5)

Middleweight:
 Prince Amartey → Bronze medal
 1/8-final — Defeat José Luis Espinosa of Mexico (5 — 0)
 1/4-final — Defeat Poul Knudsen of Denmark (3 — 2)
 Semi-Final — Lost to Reima Virtanen of Finland (2 — 3)

Football

Men
First Round (Group D)

Group D

Team Roster
 Oliver Acquah
 Armah Akuetteh
 Edward Boye
 Abukari Caribah
 Joseph Derchie
 John Eshun
 Albert Essuman
 Henry Lante France
 Joe Ghartey
 Malik Jabir
 Osei Kofi
 Peter Lamptey
 Essel Badu Mensah
 Alex Mingle
 Clifford Odame
 Kwasi Owusu
 Joseph Sam
 Yaw Sam
 Ibrahim Sunday

Nations at the 1972 Summer Olympics
1972 Summer Olympics
Olympics